Carl Einar Pelander (October 18, 1893 – February 16, 1966) was a stamp dealer and auctioneer who was an expert on postage stamps and postal history of the Scandinavian countries of Denmark, Greenland, Iceland, Danish West Indies, Finland, Norway, and Sweden.

Collecting interests
Pelander started collecting stamps as a youth, and quickly specialized in collecting those of the Scandinavian countries.

Pelander was one of the founders of New York City's Finnish-American Stamp Club in 1935 and was the first member to be named an Honorary Life Member. The club was later renamed the Scandinavian Collectors Club of New York, and then again later as Scandinavian Collectors Club. Pelander was very active in the organization, helping to finance it during poor economic times, and editing the club journal The Posthorn.

Sales activity
Carl Pelander started his New York City stamp business in 1937 and, between 1940 and 1963, he conducted 130 auctions of stamps. His auctions contained material from stamp collections of famous collectors, such as Agathon Fabergé, Caroline P. Cromwell, and Ferrars H. Tows.

Philatelic literature
Because of his in-depth knowledge of the philately of Scandinavia, and especially Finland, Pelander wrote a number of articles, some of which were compiled into his book The Postal Issues of Finland which was published in 1940. He also published a Scandinavian Check List from 1937 to 1948.

Honors and awards
Pelander was presented with the Fieandt Memorial medal in 1960 by the Finnish Philatelic Society "for his original research in the stamps of Finland and for his promotion of Finnish philately." Pelander was named to the American Philatelic Society Hall of Fame in 1966.

Carl E. Pelander Award
The Carl E. Pelander Award was established in 1968 by the Scandinavian Collectors Club in his memory "to recognize his willingness to assist fellow collectors in all phases of Scandinavian philately."

See also
 Philately
 Philatelic literature

References

 APS Hall of Fame - Carl Einar Pelander

1893 births
1966 deaths
American stamp dealers
Philatelic literature
American philatelists
Businesspeople from New York City
American auctioneers
Philatelic auctioneers
American Philatelic Society
20th-century American businesspeople
Philately of Finland